The Muskrat Dam Lake First Nation is an Oji-Cree First Nation band government in Northern Ontario. They reside on the  Muskrat Dam Lake reserve, located on Muskrat Dam Lake in the Kenora District.  The community of Muskrat Dam, Ontario, is located on this reserve.  In June 2008, their total registered population was 387 people, of which their on-reserve population was around 195.

The reserve's primary transportation link is the Muskrat Dam Airport.

Muskrat Dam Lake is policed by the Nishnawbe-Aski Police Service, an Aboriginal-based service.

History
The Muskrat Dam Lake First Nation is part of the 1929-30 Adhesion to the James Bay Treaty of 1905 - Treaty 9.

The Muskrat Dam people have historical links to the people of Bearskin Lake, and several families have relocated from Bearskin Lake to Muskrat Dam Lake. The families that relocated to Muskrat Dam were that of Tommy and Victoria Beardy, who were joined by Jeremiah and Juliet Duncan, Moses and Eunice Fiddler, Jake and Esther Beardy and Roderick and Effie Fiddler. Later, Fiddlers' son Billy and Moses Fiddler's mother Nainee also joined the little settlement.

Due to abundance of natural resources in the area, the small community started living off the land: fishing, hunting, trapping and logging. Weagamow Lake, Ontario helped them start a sawmill operation, as well as to fly in tools, gas and grocery supplies.

Until it officially gained reserve status in 1976, Muskrat Dam was a satellite community of the Big Trout Lake.

Governance
The current elected leadership of the council consists of Chief Gordon Walter Beardy. 
Official Name     Muskrat Dam Lake 
Number 213

Membership Authority
Section 11 Band
Election Type: Custom Electoral System
Council Quorum: 3
First Nation Officials (Term: September 15, 2015 to July 31, 2017)
Chief	Gordon Walter BEARDY	
Deputy Chief Charlie Beardy
Councillor Douglas Beardy
Councillor Gabriel Fiddler
Councillor Vietta Morris
Note: Election System - The type of system used by a First Nation in the selection of its chief and councillors (can be either under the Indian Act election system, the First Nations Elections Act, a custom system, or under the provisions of a self-governing agreement).
The First Nation is part of the [Independent First Nations Alliance] of the [Nishnawbe Aski Nation].

On September 11, 2015 that Muskrat Dam Election committee held a nomination meeting, with the majority of the 14 people in attendance voting to bar candidates who had previously resigned from seeking re-election.
Three days later former Ontario regional chief Stan Beardy was declared the new chief by acclamation.

Federal judge nixed Muskrat Dam election results. Federal Court of Canada Justice Cecily Strickland ordered the results quashed with a new election to be held within six months of April 7.

Reserve Recuperates 
Stan Beardy, who was later confirmed as the reserve's rightful chief by a federal court, said an internal investigation has found that the fly-in community of 300 Oji-Cree owes about $5 million.

Notable people
 Gordon Beardy - former Keewatin Bishop for the Anglican Church of Canada who was the first Native diocesan bishop in Canada; also elected and served as the First Nation's Chief in 2002.
 Darryn Morris - deadliest man in Muskrat Dam (wish around)

External links
Muskrat Dam Lake First Nation's webpage
AANDC profile
Chiefs of Ontario profile
FirstNation.ca profile
NAN profile

References

Oji-Cree reserves in Ontario
First Nations governments in Ontario
Communities in Kenora District
Nishnawbe Aski Nation